Jaime Ruiz Sacristán (October 27, 1949 – April 12, 2020) was a Mexican businessman and banker. He was the chairman of the Mexican Stock Exchange (BMV) from 2015 until his death in 2020 from COVID-19. His twin brother, served as the Secretary of Communications and Transportation of Mexico from 1994 to 2000.

Biography
Ruiz received a bachelor's degree in business administration from Universidad Anáhuac México and an MBA from the Kellogg School of Management at Northwestern University in Evanston, Illinois.

In 2003, Ruiz founded the financial group . He was appointed vice president of the 
 (ABM) in 2007 and was promoted to chairman of the banking association from 2011 until 2013. In 2015, Jaime Ruiz Sacristán became chairman of the Mexican Stock Exchange and served in this position until his death in April 2020.

Jaime Ruiz Sacristán tested positive for COVID-19 on March 13, 2020, after returning from a vacation to Vail, Colorado. Several other Mexican executives also tested positive for coronavirus following the same trip. He died from the virus at the Hospital Ángeles del Pedregal in Mexico City on April 12, 2020, at the age of 70.

See also
COVID-19 pandemic in Mexico

References

1949 births
2020 deaths
Mexican business executives
Mexican businesspeople
Mexican bankers
Universidad Anáhuac México alumni
Kellogg School of Management alumni
People from Mexico City
Deaths from the COVID-19 pandemic in Mexico
Mexican twins